Uruguay competed at the 1996 Summer Olympics in Atlanta, United States.

Results and competitors by event

Athletics
Men's Marathon
 Waldemar Cotelo — 2:28.50 (→ 79th place)

Men's 3,000 metres Steeplechase
 Ricardo Vera
 Heat — 8:40.78 (→ did not advance)

Cycling

Track Competition
Men's Points Race
 Milton Wynants
 Final — 6 points (→ 11th place)

Men's Individual Road Race
 Gregorio Bare
 Ricardo Guedes

Diving
Women's 10 m Platform
Ana Carolina Itzaina
 Preliminary Heat — 191.40 (→ did not advance, 30th place)

Judo
Men's Half-Lightweight
 Jorge Steffano

Men's Half-Heavyweight
 Willian Bouza

Sailing
Mixed Heavyweight Dinghy
 Ricardo Fabini

Men's Windsurfer
 Andrés Isola

Swimming
Men's 100m Butterfly
 Javier Golovchenko
 Heat — 55.26 (→ did not advance, 33rd place)

Men's 200m Butterfly
 Javier Golovchenko
 Heat — 2:04.96 (→ did not advance, 37th place)

Women's 200m Breaststroke
 Erika Graf
 Heat — 2:42.97 (→ did not advance, 35th place)

Tennis
Men's Singles Competition
 Marcelo Filippini
First round — Won Luis Morejon (Ecuador) 6-7 7-5 6-1
Second round — Lost to Renzo Furlan (Italy) 7-5 6-2

Weightlifting
Men's Middleweight
Edward Silva

See also
 Uruguay at the 1995 Pan American Games

References
Montevideo.com
sports-reference

Nations at the 1996 Summer Olympics
1996 Summer Olympics
Olympics